Mbə (Mbo, Mbaw) is a Grassfields language of Cameroon.

References

Languages of Cameroon
Nkambe languages